China–Uzbekistan relations are the bilateral relationship between China and Uzbekistan. Both countries are members of the Shanghai Cooperation Organization.

History 
According to the Ming Shilu, ambassadors from the Uzbek Khanate and Bukhara Khanate corresponded with Ming China more than 20 times between 1488 and 1618.

China recognized Uzbekistan's independence on 27 December 1991 and the two countries established relations on 2 January 1992. Both countries signed the "China-Uzbek Treaty of Friendship and Cooperation" in 2005, during Uzbek leader Islam Karimov's meeting with Chinese leader Hu Jintao in Beijing.

Uzbekistan has cooperated with China in extraditing Uyghur activists from the country.

Uzbek Prime Minister Abdulla Aripov called China Uzbekistan's "closest partner" on a 26 August 2019 meeting.

Economic relations 
China is currently Uzbekistan's leading trading partner as the largest source of exports and imports for the country. China has also increasing its development loans to Uzbekistan. China regards Uzbekistan as a critical part of the Belt and Road Initiative.

References 

 
Uzbekistan
China